The Rise and Fall of Freedom of Contract (1979) is a legal-historical text on the changes in the concept of freedom of contract by English Professor Patrick Atiyah. It was published by the Oxford University Press, and a paperback edition was released in 1985.

Summary
The central theme is that the notion of a contract based on consent (or a "meeting of minds") was almost entirely absent before 1800 in the law. Instead it was based on reliance or the receipt of a benefit. You could revoke a promise, and the concept of an executory contract was unknown. Moreover, courts were more concerned with the fairness of an exchange, and not concerned merely to uphold promises or the parties' will. Damages reflected that, only being for the value of exchange, not the loss of a bargain.

Then, after 1800, the concept of contractual freedom "rose". Promises and the "intentions" of parties "became the paradigm of contract theory". Atiyah argues that it began with the notion of freedom of property, summed up in the phrase of Sir Edward Coke in Semayne's case that every man's home is his castle. Following that was the transition from a property to a contract based society.

After 1900, however, freedom of contract had had its heyday. Atiyah illustrates how the growth of consumer protection, rent and employment legislation has moved contract back into smaller confines, based on general notions of fairness.

Contents
1 Introduction
Part I The Beginnings of Freedom of Contract: The Story to 1770
2 The Condition of England in 1770
3 The Intellectual Background in 1770–I
4 The Intellectual Background in 1770–II
5 The Legal Background in 1770
6 Contract Law and Theory in 1770–I
7 Contract Law and Theory in 1770–II
Part II The Age of Freedom of Contract, 1770–1870
8 The Condition of England, 1770–1870
9 The Role of Government, 1770–1870
10 The Role of the Individual, 1770–1870
11 The Intellectual Background, 1770–1870–I
12 The Intellectual Background, 1770–1870–II
13 The Legal Background, 1770–1870
14 Freedom of Contract in the Courts, 1770–1870–I
15 Freedom of Contract in the Courts, 1770–1870–II
16 Freedom of Contract in Parliament, 1770–1870
Part III The Decline and Fall of Freedom of Contract, 1870–1970
17 The Condition of England, 1870–1970
18 The Intellectual Background, 1870–1970–I
19 The Intellectual Background, 1870–1970–II
20 The Legal Background, 1870–1970
21 The Decline of Freedom of Contract, 1870–1970
22 The Wheel Come Full Circle

See also
Atiyah's Accidents, Compensation and the Law (1970), now (2006) and updated by Peter Cane
Just price

Notes

References
JH Baker, Book Review (1980) 43 Modern Law Review 467, who makes a number of criticisms about the historical robustness of Atiyah's thesis, particularly that important questions of fact used to be left to juries, giving a misleading appearance of earlier contract cases. 

Contract law
1979 non-fiction books
Books about legal history